The 1920 United States presidential election in Ohio was held on November 2, 1920 as part of the 1920 United States presidential election. State voters chose 24 electors to the Electoral College, who voted for president and vice president. 

Ohio was the home state of both presidential nominees, who each held a statewide elected office there at the time of the presidential election. The Republican candidate, U.S. Senator Warren G. Harding, defeated the Democratic candidate, Governor of Ohio James M. Cox, in the popular vote handily, 58.47–38.58%.

Results

Results by county

See also
 United States presidential elections in Ohio

References

Ohio
1920
1920 Ohio elections